In geometry, the great deltoidal icositetrahedron (or great sagittal disdodecahedron) is the dual of the nonconvex great rhombicuboctahedron. Its faces are darts. Part of each dart lies inside the solid, hence is invisible in solid models.

One of its halves can be rotated by 45 degrees to form the pseudo great deltoidal icositetrahedron, analogous to the pseudo-deltoidal icositetrahedron.

Proportions 
Its dihedral angles equal . The ratio between the lengths of the long edges and the short ones equals .

References

External links

Dual uniform polyhedra